The 32nd César Awards ceremony, presented by the Académie des Arts et Techniques du Cinéma, honoured the best films of 2006 in France and took place on 24 February 2007 at the Théâtre du Châtelet in Paris. The ceremony was chaired by Claude Brasseur and hosted by Valérie Lemercier. Lady Chatterley won the award for Best Film.

Winners and nominees

Viewers
The show was followed by 2.3 millions of viewers. This corresponds to 12% of the audience.

See also
 79th Academy Awards
 60th British Academy Film Awards
 19th European Film Awards
 12th Lumières Awards

References

External links
 Official website
 
 32nd César Awards at AlloCiné

2007
2007 film awards
2007 in French cinema
2007 in Paris
February 2007 events in France